Prince Shuncheng of the Second Rank, or simply Prince Shuncheng, was the title of a princely peerage used in China during the Manchu-led Qing dynasty (1644–1912). It was also one of the 12 "iron-cap" princely peerages in the Qing dynasty, which meant that the title could be passed down without being downgraded.

The first bearer of the title was Lekdehun (1619–1652), a great-grandson of Nurhaci, the founder of the Qing dynasty. In 1648, he was awarded the title "Prince Shuncheng of the Second Rank" by the Shunzhi Emperor. The emperor also granted "iron-cap" status to the peerage, which meant that the subsequent bearer of the title would be known as "Prince Shuncheng of the Second Rank" by default. In 1731, Xibao (1688–1742), the eighth Prince Shuncheng, was promoted from a junwang (second-rank prince) to qinwang (first-rank prince), hence he became known as "Prince Shuncheng of the First Rank". However, in 1733, Xibao was stripped of his title for committing an offence, and his title was then downgraded back to "Prince Shuncheng of the Second Rank" and passed on to his son, Xiliang (died 1744). The Prince Shuncheng peerage was passed down over 11 generations and held by 16 persons.

Members of the Prince Shuncheng peerage

 Lekdehun (勒克德渾; 1619 – 1652; 1st), Sahaliyan's second son and Daišan's grandson, held the title Prince Shuncheng of the Second Rank from 1648 to 1652, posthumously honoured as Prince Shuncheng Gonghui of the Second Rank (順承恭惠郡王)
1 & 2 Ha'erha (哈爾哈) & Sala (薩喇)
3 Nuoluobu (諾羅布; died 1717; 7th), held the title Prince Shuncheng of the Second Rank from 1715 to 1717, posthumously honoured as Prince Shuncheng Zhong of the Second Rank (順承忠郡王)
1 to 3 E'erbu (額爾布), Huxiba (祜錫巴) & Jilantai (濟蘭太)
4 Xibao (錫保; 1688 – 1742; 8th), held the title Prince Shuncheng of the Second Rank from 1717 to 1731, promoted to Prince Shuncheng of the First Rank in 1731, his title stripped in 1733
1 Xiliang (熙良; died 1744; 9th), held the title Prince Shuncheng of the Second Rank from 1733 to 1744, posthumously honoured as Prince Shuncheng Ke of the Second Rank (順承恪郡王)
1 Taifeiying'a (泰斐英阿; died 1756; 10th), held the title Prince Shuncheng of the Second Rank from 1744 to 1756, posthumously honoured as Prince Shuncheng Gong of the Second Rank (順承恭郡王)
1 Hengying (恆英), held the title of a grace general. He was also a guard soldier
2 Hengling (恆齡), held the title of a third class supporter general. He was also a palace director
3 Hengjing (恆景)
4 Hengchang (恆昌; died 1778; 11th), held the title Prince Shuncheng of the Second Rank from 1756 to 1778, posthumously honoured as Prince Shuncheng Shen of the Second Rank (順承慎郡王)
1 Lunzhu (倫柱; 1772 – 1823; 12th), held the title Prince Shuncheng of the Second Rank from 1786 to 1823, posthumously honoured as Prince Shuncheng Jian of the Second Rank (順承簡郡王)
1 Chunshan (春山; 1800 – 1854; 13th), held the title Prince Shuncheng of the Second Rank from 1823 to 1854, posthumously honoured as Prince Shuncheng Qin of the Second Rank (順承勤郡王)
Qing'en (慶恩; 1844 – 1881; 14th), held the title Prince Shuncheng of the Second Rank from 1854 to 1881, posthumously honoured as Prince Shuncheng Min of the Second Rank (順承敏郡王)
Nalehe (訥勒赫; 1881 – 1917; 15th), held the title Prince Shuncheng of the Second Rank from 1881 to 1917, posthumously honoured as Prince Shuncheng Zhi of the Second Rank (順承質郡王)
2 Chunyou (春佑; 1801 – 1876), held the title of a third class defender general
Qiande (謙德; 1834 – 1895), held the title of a third class bulwark general
Changfu (長福; 3 May 1872 - 31 Aug 1923), held the title of a grace general. He was also a deputy director of Industry department and was a friend of Liang Qichao when he worked as consul at Kobe. He later died at Japan
1 & 2 Wenzao (文藻) & Wenzhi (文芷)
3 Wenkui (文葵; 1911 – 1992; 16th), adopted as Nalehe's son, held the title Prince Shuncheng of the Second Rank from 1917 to 1945
4 Wenpeng (文蓬; 25 Dec 1922 - 12 May 2013), he died at China
Xiangzheng (祥徵)
Quanfu (銓福), held the title of a grace general
2 Luncheng (倫成), held the title of a first class bulwark general. He was also a second class guard
3 Lunzheng (倫正), held the title of a second class bulwark general
5 Hengqing (恆慶), held the title of a supporter general. He was also a striker guard
6 Hengbo (恆博), held the title of a third class supporter general, his title later got stripped 
2 & 3 Zuncheng (尊承) & Dejiao (德交)
4 Keming (克明), held the title of a defender general
5 Dezong (德宗), held the title of a grace general. He was also a guard soldier
6 & 7 Deying (德英) & Tejing (特經)
2 to 5 Qingde (慶德), Liushisan (六十三), Cha'erdan (察爾丹) & Angjili (昂吉禮)
5 & 6 Baofu (保福) & Baoshang (保尚)
7 Fengnehe (封訥赫), held the title of a grace general, his title later got stripped
4 Lergiyen (勒爾錦; died 1706; 2nd), Lekdehun's fourth son, held the title Prince Shuncheng of the Second Rank from 1652 to 1680, his title stripped in 1680
1 & 2 Leshou (勒綬) & Su'erfou (蘇爾佛)
3 Lerbei (勒爾貝; died 1682; 3rd), held the title Prince Shuncheng of the Second Rank from 1681 to 1682
4 Yanqi (延奇; died 1687; 4th), held the title Prince Shuncheng of the Second Rank from 1682 to 1687
5 Mububa (穆布巴; 6th), held the title Prince Shuncheng of the Second Rank from 1698 to 1715, his title stripped in 1715
Jinbu (進布), Heshengtu (赫勝圖), Ban'e (伴鄂) & Zhulong'e (珠隆阿)
6 Shuomubu (碩穆布)
7 Chongbao (充保; died 1698; 5th), held the title Prince Shuncheng of the Second Rank from 1687 to 1698
8 to 14 Xidabu (錫達布), Bintu (賓圖), Xintu (新圖), Ba'erdan (巴爾丹), Lintu (林圖), Kangkala (康喀喇) & Duo'ersai (多爾賽)

Family tree

|-
|Legend:
 - Title bearers
 - Emperors

|-
|Legend:
 - Title bearers
 - Emperors

|-
|Legend:
 - Title bearers
 - Emperors
|-
|

See also
 Royal and noble ranks of the Qing dynasty

References
 

Qing dynasty princely peerages
Prince Shuncheng